The Snowball Derby presented by Bayou Fox Hooters is a 300-lap super late model stock car race held annually at the Five Flags Speedway, a half-mile paved oval track in Pensacola, Florida, United States. The race has been contested every year since 1968 and is typically run on the first Sunday in December, although in some years it has been run on the second Sunday.

The Snowball Derby has a reputation for attracting some of the bigger names in short track racing, including top series NASCAR drivers (when not in conflict with their year-end banquet) because it is run after most tracks and touring series have concluded their season.  For example, the 2009 event was won by NASCAR driver Kyle Busch, and also featured Steve Wallace, Bobby Gill, Chase Elliott, Matt Kenseth's son Ross Kenseth, David Stremme, and Cale Gale.  As a result, in 2017, NASCAR moved the Cup Series prizegiving banquet to the Thursday instead of Friday, as in years past, in order to allow drivers to participate in the Snowball Derby.

Because of the "all-star" nature of the race, the Snowball Derby is considered by many to be the most prestigious race in super late model racing. Though most drivers entering the race are from nearby states, some drivers travel across the United States to compete, mainly because of the posted awards and super late model rules, which are very similar to each other regardless of track or tours (the United Super Late Model Rules Alliance).

The Snowball Derby has been won by past and future stars of NASCAR, including five national series champions (one Cup Series, two who won both a Cup Series and Xfinity championship, two Camping World Truck, total ten national championships), five Sprint Cup Series, two Xfinity Series, and seven Camping World Truck Series race winners.  The 1994 Snowball Derby winner was female driver, and future NASCAR competitor, Tammy Jo Kirk.  From 2011 until 2014, the Snowball was won by teenage drivers who have since won on NASCAR's national series.  In the 2010s, only two drivers (2015, 2019) were in his 20s and one driver (2017) was in his 30s.

Over the years, the race format has varied between 100 laps, 200 laps, and a unique 300 laps plus additional laps equalling the number of runnings of this race.  The format has settled into a straight 300 lap event, though a late yellow flag can create a green-white-checkered finish that extends the race beyond 300 laps.

The Snowball Derby is an independent event, meaning that it is not officially sanctioned (for a fee) by a racing organization.  However, it is associated with both the United Super Late Model Rules Alliance and the Southern Super Series, a series of Super Late Model races in the region including Five Flags Speedway, with officials from that series, most notably Ricky Brooks as chief steward, officiating the race.  Most Super Late Model races are run with the USLMRA package, regardless of tracks or regional series (although the track requires Continental AG tires, while some tracks may use American Racer or Goodyear), various series will encourage drivers to attend the event (PASS North and South, Southern Super Series, ARCA JEG'S/CRA, Spears Southwest). In the past the Snowball was sanctioned by Bob Harmon's All Pro organization, and for one year by NASCAR when it acquired All Pro.

The Snowflake 100 is a 100-lap pro late model race held the Saturday before the Snowball Derby. Held since 1999, notable winners include Chase Elliott and John Hunter Nemechek.

The Snowball Derby 75 is a 75-lap modified race held since 2018.

List of Snowball Derby winners
1968	Wayne Niedecken Sr.
1969	Friday Hassler
1970	Wayne Niedecken Sr.
1971	Dickie Davis
1972	Ed Howe
1973	Dickie Davis
1974	Pete Hamilton
1975	Donnie Allison
1976	Darrell Waltrip
1977	Ronnie Sanders
1978	Dave Mader III
1979	Freddy Fryar
1980	Gary Balough
1981	Freddy Fryar
1982	Gene Morgan
1983	Mickey Gibbs
1984	Butch Lindley
1985	Jody Ridley
1986	Gary Balough
1987	Butch Miller
1988	Ted Musgrave
1989	Rick Crawford
1990	Rich Bickle
1991	Rich Bickle
1992	Gary St. Amant
1993	Bobby Gill
1994	Tammy Jo Kirk (First female driver ever to win the Snowball Derby)
1995	Jeff Purvis
1996	 Rich Bickle
1997	Bobby Gill
1998	Rich Bickle
1999	Rich Bickle
2000	Gary St. Amant
2001	Wayne Anderson
2002	Ricky Turner
2003	Charlie Bradberry
2004	Steve Wallace
2005  	Eddie Mercer
2006   Johnny Brazier
2007	Augie Grill
2008   Augie Grill
2009   Kyle Busch
2010   Johanna Long
2011   Chase Elliott (Youngest winner in Snowball Derby history)
2012   Erik Jones
2013   Erik Jones
2014   John Hunter Nemechek
2015 Chase Elliott
2016 Christian Eckes
2017 Kyle Busch
2018 Noah Gragson
2019 Travis Braden
2020 Ty Majeski
2021 Chandler Smith
2022 Derek Thorn

References

External links
Official website

Motorsport competitions in Florida
Sports in Pensacola, Florida
Stock car races